The Direct Action and Research Training Center (DART) is a national network of 23 local faith-based community organizing groups across nine states. DART provides training and consultation for local leaders and professional organizers, giving local communities the skills they need to uncover and take action on pressing local problems. As of 2007, DART is the fourth largest congregation-based community organizing network in the United States.

History
In order to address the unfair treatment of seniors in Miami in 1977, a gathering of religious leaders founded Concerned Seniors of Dade. The organization developed a reputation for being able to quickly and consistently bring together hundreds of people to press city officials around the fair treatment of senior citizens.

Following the eruption of a three-day riot in the city of Miami in response to the police killing of Arthur McDuffie in 1980, leaders from Concerned Seniors of Dade decided to expand their focus and establish People United to Lead the Struggle for Equality (PULSE) organization.

After successfully winning multiple local campaigns for fairness regarding unemployment, minority hiring, and racism in the justice system, the work of PULSE caught the attention of other local communities. In order to equip faith communities in other cities to answer their call to do justice, the DART Center was founded to provide training and expertise in 1982.

Since that time, DART’s work quickly spread to other cities in Florida as well as Ohio and Kentucky in the 1980s. In the 1990s, more organizations in Florida as well as Indiana and Virginia were built and expanded its leadership training curriculum. In the 2000s, DART developed a national strategy for recruiting and training professional organizers along with further expansion. In the last decade, DART expanded into South Carolina, Tennessee, Kansas and Georgia.

Since its founding, DART has trained over 10,000 community leaders and 270 professional community organizers, who together have greatly impacted their communities.

Issues addressed
DART affiliates typically have a broad agenda of issues, including racism, public education improvement, criminal justice reform, healthcare provisions, affordable housing, accessible public transportation, and immigrants' rights.

Training
Since 1982 DART has trained over 10,000 community leaders and 270 professional organizers.

In addition to training local volunteer leaders, DART trains professional organizers through the DART Organizers Institute, an on-the-job training for faith-based community organizers. It begins with a four-day classroom orientation followed by five months of field training and a weekly reading and written curriculum related to the basic principles of community organizing. All parts of the Institute take place in each organizer's respective city, so they begin building relationships in their community from day one.

Organizers are assigned to work with select religious congregations in order to expand participation at a major direct action where issues of justice are addressed. Skill development initially focuses on articulating the mission of the organization, intentionally developing relationships through one-on-one conversations, engaging leaders based on their personal motivations, time management, running effective meetings, building networks, long-term planning, working with clergy, and issue development.

Vocational development continues throughout an organizer’s career with an annual schedule of three two-day training and planning retreats, summer staff retreats, and joint regional staff trainings.

Local organization membership
DART has 23 affiliated congregation-based community organizations across Florida, Georgia, Indiana, Kansas, Kentucky, Ohio, South Carolina, Tennessee, and Virginia. DART and affiliates employ some 50 professional community organizers.

DART affiliates are listed below
 Florida
 Broward Organized Leaders Doing Justice (BOLD Justice) -- Fort Lauderdale
 Fighting Against Injustice Toward Harmony (FAITH) -- Daytona Beach
 Faith and Action for Strength Together (FAST) -- St. Petersburg
 Hillsborough Organization for Progress and Equality (HOPE) -- Tampa
 Interfaith Coalition for Action, Reconciliation and Empowerment (ICARE) – Jacksonville
 Justice United Seeking Transformation in Pensacola (JUST Pensacola) -- Pensacola
 Lee Interfaith for Empowerment (LIFE) -- Fort Myers
 People Acting for Community Together (PACT) – Miami
 People Engaged in Active Community Efforts (PEACE) – West Palm Beach
 Polk Ecumenical Action Council for Empowerment (PEACE) -- Lakeland
 Sarasota United for Responsibility and Equity (SURE) -- Sarasota
 Georgia
 Justice Unites Savannah Together (JUST) -- Savannah
 Indiana
 Congregations Acting for Justice and Empowerment (CAJE) -- Evansville
 Kansas
 Justice Matters—Lawrence
 Topeka Justice Unity & Ministry Project (Topeka JUMP) -- Topeka
 Kentucky
 Building a United Interfaith Lexington through Direct-action (BUILD) -- Lexington
 Citizens of Louisville Organized and United Together (CLOUT) – Louisville
 Ohio
 Building Responsibility, Equality and Dignity (BREAD) – Columbus
 South Carolina
 Charleston Area Justice Ministry (CAJM) -- Charleston
 MORE Justice—Columbia
 Tennessee
 Justice Knox—Knoxville
 Virginia
 Interfaith Movement Promoting Action by Congregations Together (IMPACT) – Charlottesville
 Richmonders Involved to Strengthen our Communities (RISC) -- Richmond

Notes

External links
 DART Center website

Non-profit organizations based in Florida
Community organizations